Chiew Choon Man is a Malaysian politician and lawyer who served as the Member of Parliament (MP) for Miri from November 2022. He is a member of the People's Justice Party (PKR), a component party of presently the Pakatan Harapan (PH)

Election results

References

Living people
People from Sarawak
Members of the Dewan Rakyat
Malaysian politicians of Chinese descent
People's Justice Party (Malaysia) politicians
21st-century Malaysian people
21st-century Malaysian politicians
Year of birth uncertain
Year of birth missing (living people)